Desia, also Desiya or Desia Odia or Koraputi Odia or Southwestern Odia, is an Indo-Aryan language variety (sociolinguistically considered as a dialect of Odia) spoken in Koraput, Nabarangpur, Rayagada, Malkangiri districts Odisha and in the hilly regions of Vishakhapatnam and Vizianagaram districts of Andhra Pradesh. The variant spoken in Koraput is called Koraputia.

Desia serves as the lingua franca among the different ethnic groups in the area and is the major regional tribal-non-tribal dialect continuum of the undivided Koraput district of the Southwestern Odisha region.

Phonology 

Desia variety has 21 consonant phonemes, 2 semivowel phonemes and 6 vowel phonemes.

There are no long vowels in Desia just like Standard Odia.

Desia shows loss of both voiceless and voiced aspirated consonants as well as retroflex consonants like retroflex unaspirated nasal(voiced retroflex nasal)  and voiced retroflex lateral approximant  which are present in Standard Odia.

References

Further reading 
 

Eastern Indo-Aryan languages
Languages of Odisha
Odia language